Darya Khan , is a town in Bhakkar District in the Punjab Province of Pakistan.  The town is the headquarters of Darya Khan Tehsil. The town of Darya Khan is itself subdivided into two Union councils. During British rule the railway station at Darya Khan was built as part of the North-Western Railway route. Darya Khan has a boy's secondary school built in 1928 by Englishmen and a college at the middle of the town. Darya Khan also has a luxurious housing society "Fazal City" in the heart of the city, providing lavish life style to the residents. Darya Khan is situated to the left of the  Indus River. Naseer Ahmad Shah is the prominent advocate of this city

References 

Populated places in Bhakkar District